RFA Black Ranger (A163) was a British diesel-powered fleet support tanker of the Royal Fleet Auxiliary, built by Harland & Wolff at their yard in Govan.  On 27 February 1941, shortly after her commissioning, she was involved in a collision with the French destroyer Mistral which sustained minor damage and Black Ranger spent a short period under repair on the Clyde.

Black Ranger later served with the Arctic Convoys. In November 1960 she was involved in a collision with the submarine . She was retired from service in 1973 and put up for sale. Bought by Greek owners, she was renamed Petrola XIV in 1973 and then Petrola 14 in 1976. She was scrapped at Piraeus in May 1983.

References

Ranger-class tankers
Ships built in Govan
1940 ships
Ships built by Harland and Wolff